Paraneonetus is a monotypic genus of wētā containing the species Paraneonetus multispinus, commonly known as the Three Kings cave wētā.  P. multispinus is a cave wētā in the family Rhaphidophoridae, endemic to the Three Kings Islands of New Zealand.

References 

Cave weta
Ensifera genera
Monotypic Orthoptera genera
Endemic fauna of New Zealand
Endemic insects of New Zealand